The Wentworth Group of Concerned Scientists (in short, the Wentworth Group) is an independent group comprising Australian scientists, economists and business people with conservation interests.

The name of the group comes from the venue of their principal meetings prior to release of their first blueprint; Blueprint for a Living Continent.

Program
The Wentworth Group has three core objectives:
Driving innovation in the management of Australia's biodiversity, land and water resources;
Engage business, community and political leaders in a dialogue to find and implement solutions to the challenge of environmental stewardship facing the future of Australian society;
Building capacity by mentoring and supporting young scientists, lawyers and economists to develop their skills and understanding of public policy.

The Wentworth Group first came together in November 2002. Their first statement, Blueprint for a Living Continent, set out what it believed were the key changes that needed to be made to deliver a sustainable future for our continent and its people. The Group emphasised the need to:
Clarify water property rights and the obligations associated with those rights to give farmers some certainty and to enable water to be recovered for the environment.
Restore environmental flows to stressed rivers, such as the River Murray and its tributaries.
Immediately end broad scale land clearing of remnant native vegetation and assist rural communities with adjustment. This provides fundamental benefits to water quality, prevention of salinity, prevention of soil loss and conservation of biodiversity.
Pay farmers for environmental services (clean water, fresh air, healthy soils). Where we expect farmers to maintain land in a certain way that is above their duty of care, we should pay them to provide those services on behalf of the rest of Australia.
Incorporate into the cost of food, fibre and water the hidden subsidies currently borne by the environment, to assist farmers to farm sustainably and profitably in this country.

Members

The Wentworth Group consists of:
Dr Emma Carmody, an international environmental lawyer and co-founder of Restore Blue
Peter Cosier, an urban and regional planner, policy analyst, and conservationist
Professor Tim Flannery, a mammalogist, palaeontologist, environmentalist and global warming activist, awarded as the 2007 Australian of the Year
Dr. Terry Hillman, an ecologist who is an adjunct professor at La Trobe University; a former Member of the Murray-Darling Basin Sustainable Rivers Audit
Professor Lesley Hughes, an ecologist who is a Councillor of the Australian Climate Council; Lead Author, Intergovernmental Panel on Climate Change, Working Group II; Professorial Fellow, Department of Biological Sciences, Macquarie University
Professor David Karoly, an atmospheric scientist who is the Professor of Atmospheric Science, University of Melbourne; Member, Australian Climate Change Authority; Lead Author, Intergovernmental Panel on Climate Change
Professor Richard Kingsford, a river ecologist and conservation biologist who is director for the Center for Ecosystem Science University of New South Wales
Associate Professor Bradley Moggridge, a proud Kamilaroi man and environmental hydrogeologist
Professor Jamie Pittock, an environmental scientist at the Australian National University and Member of the World Commission on Protected Areas
Rob Purves, a businessman and philanthropist who is the president of WWF Australia; Chair, Purves Environmental Fund
Professor Fran Sheldon, a river ecologist and Member of the Australian Rivers Institute, Griffith University
Anna Skarbek, an investment banker and lawyer, CEO of ClimateWorks Australia, and director of the Clean Energy Finance Corporation
Emeritus Professor Bruce Thom, a geographer who is the Chair of the 2001 Australian State of the Environment; and a former Chair, Australian Coast and Climate Change Council
Martijn Wilder, Lawyer at Baker and McKenzie, Professor of Climate Change Law at the Australian National University, Chair of the Australian Renewable Energy Agency, a director of the Clean Energy Finance Corporation, WWF Australia and the Climate Council

Former members
Dr Neil Byron, a resource economist, who was a Commissioner of the Australian Productivity Commission
Professor Peter Cullen,  (19432008), an ecologist, who served as a member of the Group until his death
Dr. Richard Davis, a hydrologist who was a Chief Science Advisor to the Australian National Water Commission; and research scientist at CSIRO Australia
Quentin Grafton, Professor of Economics, ANU Public Policy Fellow, Fellow of the Asia and the Pacific Policy Society and director of the Centre for Water Economics, Environment and Policy (CWEEP) at the Crawford School of Public Policy at the Australian National University.
Associate Professor Ronnie Harding, (19412022), a zoologist who was an Assistant Commissioner, NSW Natural Resources Commission; a former director, Institute of Environmental Studies, University of New South Wales
Professor David Lindenmayer, a landscape ecologist at the Australian National University
Mr David Papps, Former Commonwealth Environmental Water Holder 2012–2018
Professor Hugh Possingham, an applied mathematician with an interest in ecology and conservation biology
Dr. Denis Saunders, an ecologist who is the editor of Pacific Conservation Biology; and a former Chief Research Scientist, CSIRO Australia
Dr. John Williams, a hydrologist
Mike Young, an Australian economist and water policy expert, holds a Research Chair in Environmental and Water Policy at the University of Adelaide and is a Fellow of the Nicholas Institute for Environmental Policy Solutions at Duke University.

Published works
 Blueprint for a National Water Plan – a report from the Wentworth Group of Concerned Scientists 31 July 2003 (PDF, 1.2 MB)
 A New Model for Landscape Conservation in New South Wales – Wentworth Group of Concerned Scientists Report to Premier Bob Carr February 2003 (PDF, 56 kB)
 Murray-Darling Basin Plan – Wentworth Group statements on the Murray-Darling Basin Plan
 STATEMENT ON CHANGES TO COMMONWEALTH POWERS TO PROTECT AUSTRALIA’S ENVIRONMENT – a statement from the Wentworth Group of Concerned Scientists September 2012 (PDF, 460 KB)

See also

Environmental issues in Australia

References

External links
 Wentworth Group
 Purves Environmental Fund

Environmental organisations based in Australia
Nature conservation in Australia